Mikulas may refer to:

Slovak geography
 Borský Mikuláš
 Liptovský Mikuláš
 Liptovský Mikuláš District
 Plavecký Mikuláš

Sports
 Zimný štadión Liptovský Mikuláš, arena in Liptovský Mikuláš, Slovakia
 MHk 32 Liptovský Mikuláš, professional ice hockey team in the Slovak Extraliga
 Mikuláš Konopka (born 1979), Slovak shot putter

Politics
 Mikuláš Dzurinda (born 1956), Prime Minister of Slovakia from October 30, 1998 until July 4, 2006
 Mikuláš of Hus (died 1420), Bohemian politician and leading representative of the Hussite movement

Other fields
 Mikuláš Galanda (1895–1938), renowned painter, illustrator, and one of the most important pioneers and propagators of Slovak modern art
 Mikulas of Kadan (1350–1419), Imperial clockmaker who designed the clock machine of Prague Orloj together with Jan Šindel around 1410

See also 
 Mikulás, the Slovak, Czech and Hungarian version of St. Nicholas or Santa Claus

Czech masculine given names
Slovak masculine given names

cs:Mikuláš